James Robertson (born 1913) was an English professional footballer who played as an inside forward

Career
Born in Berwick-upon-Tweed, Robertson spent his early career with Welbeck Colliery, Notts County and Bradford (Park Avenue). He joined Bradford City in February 1938, scoring 17 goals in 36 league games for the club. He retired in May 1942, and later played for Tunbridge Wells Rangers.

Sources

References

1913 births
Year of death missing
English footballers
Notts County F.C. players
Bradford (Park Avenue) A.F.C. players
Bradford City A.F.C. players
Tunbridge Wells F.C. players
English Football League players
Association football inside forwards